Makra may refer to:

 Makra, the Sanskrit name for crocodile is also a vyuha in the Indian epic Mahabarta
 Makra, Greece, an island in Greece
 Makra Peak, a mountain peak in Pakistan